The Strangers were an American country band that formed in 1966 in Bakersfield, California. They mainly served as the backup band for singer-songwriter Merle Haggard, who named them after his first hit single "(My Friends Are Gonna Be) Strangers". In addition to serving as his backing band, members of the Strangers also produced many of Haggard's records, sang lead vocals on select tracks, and co-wrote many of Haggard's songs with him, including the No. 1 singles, "Okie From Muskogee" and "I Always Get Lucky with You".

From 1969 to 1973, they issued several records independent of Haggard, released on Capitol Records, and even had their own Top 10 hit single called "Street Singer" on the Billboard Hot Country Songs Chart. Three members of the Strangers would go on to be inducted into the Rock and Roll Hall of Fame. Between 1969 and 1987, the Strangers were voted Band of the Year by the Academy of Country Music eight times—more than any other group in history.

History

1960s

Lead guitarist Roy Nichols (October 21, 1932 - July 3, 2001) was from Chandler, Arizona, and had previously played with the Maddox Brothers and Rose, Lefty Frizzell, Wynn Stewart, and Johnny Cash before playing with the Strangers from 1965 until 1987, when health problems forced him into retirement.  Duncan, Oklahoma-born steel guitarist Ralph Mooney (September 16, 1928 - March 20, 2011) had previously played with Wynn Stewart and written the song "Crazy Arms", and after leaving the Strangers recorded a duo album with James Burton and then joined Waylon Jennings band.

Norm Hamlet (born February 27, 1935 in Woodville, California) joined the Strangers on steel guitar in 1967 and, shortly afterward, became its bandleader. Howard "Jerry Ward" Lowe was the Strangers original bass player and George French (March 6, 1926 - August 14, 1992) played the piano. But when Ward left, Willard "Gene" Price (February 27, 1944 - August 13, 2013) from Shamrock, Texas replaced him on bass just in time for the Okie from Muskogee album in 1969, on which he also sang lead vocals. Tulsa, Oklahoma-born Roy "Eddie" Burris (October 27, 1931 - April 19, 2011), the drummer for the Strangers, co-wrote the title track "Okie From Muskogee" with Merle Haggard.

1970s

Clair "Biff" Adam (April 19, 1936 - March 7, 2020) from Reading, Pennsylvania, replaced Burris as the Strangers drummer in 1970 and also served as Merle's publicist and bus driver.  On the album, The Fightin' Side of Me, the Strangers added rhythm guitarist Robert "Bobby Wayne" Edrington (December 11, 1941 - September 21, 2009) from Oklahoma City, Oklahoma, and they got their own showcase on the instrumental "Stealin’ Corn".  A second rhythm guitarist, Marcia "Nichols" Ashcraft (May 23, 1950 - October 1976), also joined the band 

After Bobby Wayne and Marcia Nichols left, Ronnie Reno (born September 28, 1947 in Buffalo, South Carolina) of Reno and Smiley and the Osborne Brothers  joined the Strangers on rhythm guitar, and he also produced Merle's duo album with Mac Wiseman as well as Merle's The Bluegrass Sessions. Ronnie would also sing lead vocals on albums like Merle Haggard Presents His 30th Album. Gaffney, South Carolina-born Johnny Meeks (April 16, 1937 - July 30, 2015), previously a member of Gene Vincent and the Blue Caps, the Champs, and Michael Nesmith and the Second National Band, played bass with the Strangers in the early 1970s and later got inducted into the Rock and Roll Hall of Fame.  After Meeks left, Jimmy Tittle (born December 1, 1956) played bass with the band. After leaving the Strangers, Tittle would go on to play with his father-in-law Johnny Cash. He was replaced by bassist Sherman "Wayne" Durham (July 8, 1947 - April 13, 2016.)

Bakersfield, California-born saxophonist Don Markham (November 28, 1931 - February 24, 2017), who had played with Sly & the Family Stone, the Ventures, the Bakersfield Brass, and Johnny Paycheck played with the Strangers from 1974 to 2013.  In the mid-1970s, former Bob Wills and the Texas Playboys guitarist Estel "Eldon" Shamblin (April 24, 1916 - August 5, 1998), who was born in Clinton, Oklahoma, was invited to join the Strangers. After retiring from the Strangers, Eldon Shamblin would continue to perform with them whenever they played in Tulsa. Electric mandolinist Billie "Tiny" Moore (May 12, 1920 - December 15, 1987) from Port Arthur, Texas also joined the Strangers during the 1970s. Like Eldon Shamblin, Tiny Moore had also been a member of Bob Wills and the Texas Playboys.

In the late 1970s Decatur, Alabama-born Gordon Terry (October 7, 1931 - April 9, 2006) joined the Strangers on  fiddle. Terry had previously played with Bill Monroe, Faron Young, and Johnny Cash.

1980s

After Gordon Terry left the band, fiddler Jimmy Belken (May 25, 1931 - August 19, 2000) joined the Strangers. Born in Dallas, Texas, Belken had previously played with Bob Wills and the Texas Playboys as well as Mel Tillis and the Statesiders.  In addition to serving as Strangers bassist, Dennis Hromek (born November 12, 1940) would also sing some lead vocals at Strangers shows.  When Hromek left Bobby Wayne returned to the Strangers, this time playing bass. 
Other noteworthy members of the band included Princeton, Illinois-born trumpet player Gary Church (March 26, 1951 - June 22, 2018), and Los Angeles, California-born keyboardist Mark Yeary (1952 - January 17, 2020), who also served as Merle's co-producer on his records. Clint Strong (born in 1966), who had studied under Stan Kenton, joined the Strangers on lead guitar during the mid-1980s. Sheril Rodgers (born in 1953), co-wrote with Merle and singer/songwriter Freddy Powers. Sheril toured with the Strangers as backup singer from 1983-1984 and co-wrote "Let's Chase Each Other Around the Room Tonight".

Discography

Albums credited to the Strangers
{| class="wikitable"
|-
! Released
! Album
! US Country
! Label
|-
| February 23, 1969
| The Instrumental Sounds of Merle Haggard's Strangers
| style="text-align:center;"| 36
| rowspan="12"| Capitol Records
|-
| April 6, 1970
| Introducing My Friends the Strangers
| style="text-align:center;"| 34
|-
| October 5, 1970
| Getting to Know Merle Haggard's Strangers
| style="text-align:center;"| 44
|-
| June 21, 1971
| Honky Tonkin'''
| style="text-align:center;"| 34
|-
| May 1, 1973
| Totally Instrumental...With One Exception| style="text-align:center;"| 23
|}

Singles credited to the Strangers

Albums credited to Merle Haggard and the Strangers

Singles credited to Merle Haggard and the Strangers

Albums credited to Bonnie Owens and the Strangers

Singles credited to Bonnie Owens and the Strangers

Albums credited to Leona Williams and the Strangers

The Strangers as Backing Band

Contribution to Merle Haggard Albums

Songwriting

Production

Lead Vocal

Liner Notes

Merle Call-Outs
Merle Haggard famously called out members of the Strangers by name on his records prior to their solos. He sometimes prefixed their name with “Brother,” as in the song "I Think I'll Just Stay Here and Drink" when he called out “Brother Don” Markham. For 20 years (1969 – 1989) he regularly called out 16 different members of the Strangers and 14 guest musicians on 70 songs on 31 different albums. Roy Nichols received the most call-outs (42), followed by Norm Hamlet (24), Tiny Moore (13), Mark Yeary (10), and Don Markham (9). Below is a list of all the songs and Stranger call-outs Merle made over his career. Not listed are callouts the Strangers received by others than Merle, such as when Leona Williams called out Roy Nichols during “Yes Ma’am This One Can” on her 1976 Strangers-backed album “San Quentin’s First Lady,” or when Rose Maddox called Roy Nichols out prior to his “Downtown Modesto” solo on her 1983 Strangers-backed album “Queen of the West.”

Awards and recognition

Academy of Country Music Band of the Year Awards

Music City News (Now named CMT Music Awards) Band of the Year Awards

Academy of Country Music Awards Won With Merle Haggard

Country Music Association Awards Won With Merle Haggard

Academy of Country Music Individual Nominations

Strangers in the Rock and Roll Hall of Fame

Merle Haggard’s poem for the Strangers

For the back cover of their 1973 album Totally Instrumental...With One Exception'', Merle wrote the following poem for the Strangers:

When Hag passes on
To the great unknown
They'll find written on the front
Of my headstone
“Here lies a man
Who had a hell-of-a-band
And who would never had made it alone.”

Timeline 1966-1991

Further reading

References

Country music groups from California
Musical backing groups
Musical groups established in 1966
Musical groups from Bakersfield, California
Capitol Records artists
MCA Records artists